The hunting lodge of Augustusburg was built from 1568 to 1572 above the town of the same name on a hill called the Schellenberg on the northern edge of the Ore Mountains of Germany. The castle, which is visible from afar, is a local landmark. It lies about 12 kilometres east of the city of Chemnitz and about 21 kilometres southwest of Freiberg in the Free State of Saxony.

In building a new castle, Prince Elector Augustus wanted not just to create a prestigious palace for his hunting trips, but also to underline his leading position in Central Germany. The immediate occasion for its construction was his victory in the Grumbach Brawl. By enforcing the imperial ban on his Ernestine rivals – John Frederick the Middle and outlawed knight, Wilhelm von Grumbach, who sought refuge with John Frederick – the Albertine elector, Augustus, was able secure his supremacy over the Ernestines. Thanks to the thriving economy of the Electorate of Saxony under Moritz and Augustus, the necessary finance for the construction of the castle was available.

Background 
Before the hunting lodge was built, an old castle owned by the von Schellenberg family was located on the same spot.

This had been built around 1210/30 and was granted in 1324 to the House of Wettin after the so-called Schellenberg Feud. It was further fortified in the late 14th century. For example, an outer wall and a well and wellhouse were built. Between 1528 and 1547 the castle was severely damaged by fire and lightning. An illustration in the altar picture of the castle church could be of the Schellenburg at that time, but it is not clear.

For a long time the design of the palace was attributed to the master builder and mayor of Leipzig, Hieronymus Lotter. It is clear, however, that when Lotter was appointed, a finished model of the castle already existed. According to current thinking, he only had the role of chief architect, responsible for executing the completed design. The two plans made by him are based on the already finished wooden model and the annotated changes he proposed were mainly declined by the Elector. The Italian style stairs with their straight flights (instead of the usual spiral staircases) and details in the design of the roofs are assigned to his influence. The design of parts of the north portal and chapel of the hunting lodge are traceable to Erhardt van der Meer, Lotter's senior clerk of works. The first clerk of works during the construction was Paul Widemann until his death in 1568.

Current understanding is that it was most likely that the overall design was prepared at the court of Elector Augustus under the supervision of the architect, Hans Irmscher. Since there are gaps in the sources relating to the authorship of the designs of Augustusburg Castle, it has even been attributed to Augustus himself. What is clear is the Elector's great interest in matters concerning construction and architecture. His library contained many architectural documents and template books of architectural elements. The architecture of the castle does not match that of traditional palace buildings in the rest of Saxony. Rather, it may be assumed that the Elector took the inspiration for his creation from the theoretical documents in his library.

Personalities 
 Georg Renkewitz (1687–1758) organist and organ builder in Augustusburg
 Sophie Sabina Apitzsch (1692–1752), confidence trickster, was imprisoned here in 1714
 Ludwig Würkert (1800–1876), Protestant priest, author and revolutionary, was imprisoned here in 1849
 Hans Seifert (1889–?), Nazi politician, leader of the Gauschulungsburg on the Augustusburg, where he also lived
 Fritz Rößler (1912–1987), NSDAP-Politiker, leader of the Gauschulungsburg on the Augustusburg, later under the name, Dr. Franz Richter, Bundestag MP

Motorcycle museum 
The castle contains a motorcycle museum with 1200 m² of exhibit space comprising 175 individual exhibits.  The collection has objects across the history of motorcycling, including an example of the first series-produced motorcycle, a Hildebrand & Wolfmüller.

Gallery

References 

 
 
 Peter Geipel: Die Augustusburg und ihre Landschaft. Reihe Deutsche Berge Vol. 4, Chemnitz, 1926
 Britta Günther: Schloss Augustusburg. Reihe Sachsens schönste Schlösser, Burgen und Gärten Vol. 2, Verlag Edition Leipzig, Leipzig, 2000, 
 Paul Heinicke: Geschichte und Sehenswürdigkeiten des Schlosses Augustusburg. Verlag Heimatland Sachsen, Chemnitz, 1992 (Nachdruck der Originalausgabe von 1920)
 Hans-Joachim Krause: Schloss Augustusburg 1572 – 1972. Baugeschichte und denkmalpflegerische Instandsetzung. Augustusburg, 1972
 Uwe Meinig: Motorradmuseum im Schloss Augustusburg., Augustusburg, 1999
 Erika Ranft: Augustusburg – Schloss des Schicksals, Projekte-Verlag Cornelius, Halle, 2010
 Friedrich Wilhelm Renkewitz: Kurze Beschreibung des Schlosses Augustusburg und seiner Umgebungen. Verlag Karl Tauchnitz, Leipzig, 1836 (Digitalisat)
 Stadt Augustusburg (pub.): Schellenberg – Augustusburg. Beiträge zur 800-jährigen Geschichte. Augustusburg, 2006

 Herbert Wilhelmi: Forstliche Denkmale in Sachsen – Mittlerer Landesteil -, Hrsg. Sächsischer Forstverein e. V., 1999

External links 

 Internet site for Schloss Augustusburg

Motorcycle museums in Germany
Castles in Saxony
Hunting lodges in Germany
Museums in the Ore Mountains
Ore Mountains
Buildings and structures in Mittelsachsen
hunting lodge
Royal residences in Saxony